Montresor is a surname, and may refer to:

Adelaide Montresor, née Adelaide Malanotte (1785–1832), Italian opera singer
Beni Montresor (1926–2001), Italian artist and illustrator
Frederick Montresor (1811–1887), British admiral
Henry Montresor (1767–1837), British army general
James Gabriel Montresor (1704–1776), British military engineer
John Montresor (1736–1799), British military engineer and cartographer
Maxminio Montresor (born 1980), Brazilian football goalkeeper